Mirosława Jastrzębska, née Kwiatkowska (born 21 March 1921 in Gąbin, Poland; died 24 October 1982) was a Polish scientist, ethnographer, and museum curator.

She graduated from the Maria Curie-Skłodowska University in ethnography and ethnology and in 1951 under the guidance of  she defended her Masters thesis  Folk architecture in the village of Smolanka, poviat Łuków (Budownictwo ludowe we wsi Smolanka, pow. Łuków). After that she worked at various museums. As a researcher, she was mainly interested in annual and family folk rituals and folk art. She was an active member of the : she popularized folk art and other subjects of her expertise by organizing fairs, competitions, exhibitions and lectures.

She was curator of the Regional Museum in Tomaszów Mazowiecki.

In 1950 she married , also an ethnographer.

Awards and decorations
She was decorated with Gold Cross of Merit. She also received regional distinctions and awards including the Award of the Voivode of Łódź in 1973.

References

1921 births
1982 deaths
Polish ethnographers
Polish ethnologists
Directors of museums in Poland
People from Tomaszów Mazowiecki
Polish women curators